Kull may refer to:

Arts
 Kull of Atlantis, a fictional character created by Robert E. Howard
 Kull the Conqueror, a 1997 fantasy action film based on Howard's character and starring Kevin Sorbo
 King Kull (DC Comics), a Fawcett Comics and DC Comics character
 Kull (Inheritance), a subspecies of Urgals from the Inheritance Cycle series of novels by Christopher Paolini
 Kull (collection), a collection of short stories by Robert E. Howard

Other uses
 Kull (surname)
 Kull, Punjab, a Union Council in the Punjab province of Pakistan
 KULL, a US radio station
 Kull shay, a magazine published in Cairo between 1925 and 1927